Erik Simonsen (5 August 1915 – 1 December 2000) was a Danish long-distance runner. He competed in the marathon at the 1952 Summer Olympics.

References

External links
 

1915 births
2000 deaths
Athletes (track and field) at the 1952 Summer Olympics
Danish male long-distance runners
Danish male marathon runners
Olympic athletes of Denmark
Sportspeople from Aalborg